Brian Milnes (born 12 March 1932) is a former  Australian rules footballer who played with St Kilda in the Victorian Football League (VFL).

Milnes is the father-in-law of Mark Lisle and grandfather of Jordan Lisle.

Notes

External links 

Living people
1932 births
Australian rules footballers from Victoria (Australia)
St Kilda Football Club players